George Rampton (28 October 1888 – 31 March 1971) was an English professional footballer who played as a forward.

References

1888 births
1971 deaths
Footballers from Brighton
English footballers
Association football forwards
Nuneaton PSA F.C. players
Atherstone Town F.C. players
Nuneaton Borough F.C. players
Stafford Rangers F.C. players
Walsall F.C. players
Grimsby Town F.C. players
English Football League players